= Samsung M550 Exclaim =

Cell phone model

Samsung Exclaim
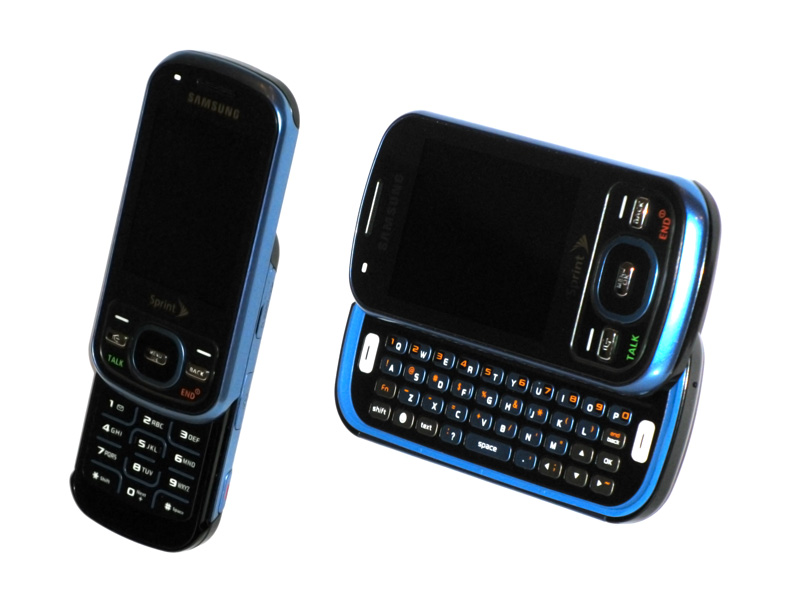
- Manufacturer: Samsung
- Availability by region: June 2009
- Compatible networks: CDMA2000 1xRTT/1xEV-DO rev.0
- Form factor: Dual Slider
- Dimensions: 4.45 x 2.24 x 0.67 inches (113 x 57 x 17 mm)
- Weight: 4.69 oz (133 g)
- Removable storage: microSD/microSDHC, up to 32Gb
- Battery: Li - Ion, 960 mAh (4.75 hours (285 mins) of talk time)
- Rear camera: 2 Megapixels
- Front camera: No
- Display: 262 144 colors, TFT, 240 x 320 pixels, 2.60 inches
- External display: No
- Connectivity: microUSB, 2.0, Stereo Bluetooth
- Data inputs: 2 keypads

Samsung Exclaim (SPH-M550) is a dual-slider mobile phone, meaning it contains both an alpha numeric as well as a full QWERTY keyboard packed into one device. The phone became available to US Sprint users in June 2009 for $79.00 after a mail-in rebate and a two-year service contract from the carrier. Preloaded applications include YouTube, Google Maps, Sprint Social Zone, Facebook, and MySpace, among others.

== Features ==
Weight	4.69 ounces
Dimensions	2.24” x 4.45” x .67”
Display technology	262K TFT
Display size	2'6”
Display resolution	240 x 320
Battery talk time	Up to 4.75 hours
Camera resolution	2 MP
Video	Yes, 240p
Music player	Yes
Messaging	SMS/EMS/MMS/Email/vCard/vCalendar/IM
Connectivity	Bluetooth/WAP/HTML Browser/Outlook Sync
